Juha Pekka Leskinen (born 26 February 1954) is a Finnish former competitive figure skater. He represented Finland at the 1976 Winter Olympics in Innsbruck and finished 13th overall. He won the Finnish national title three times (1970, 1971, 1975). Later in his career, he was an ISU Judge for Finland and judged in the 2002, 2010, and 2018 Winter Olympics.

Results

References

1954 births
Living people
Finnish male single skaters
Figure skaters at the 1976 Winter Olympics
Olympic figure skaters of Finland
People from Kuopio
Sportspeople from North Savo